UFOria is a science fiction comedy film written and directed by John Binder and starring Fred Ward, Harry Dean Stanton, Harry Carey, Jr. and Cindy Williams. The film includes small appearances by Peggy McKay, Joe Unger, Hank Worden, Charlotte Stewart, and Alan Beckwith. Filming was completed in 1981, but the film was not theatrically released until 1985. It was released only on VHS in 1987 by MCA Home Video, now known as Universal Studios Home Entertainment.

Plot 
Sheldon Bart (Fred Ward) is a drifter, and a small-time con man. He meets his old friend, Brother Bud (Harry Dean Stanton), a big-time con man into faith healing and fencing stolen cars, at his revival tent outside a small town. Bud has developed a real ability to heal, although he has no idea how this has happened. While he's helping Brother Bud, Sheldon falls in love with Arlene (Cindy Williams), a local supermarket clerk who believes in UFOs and is deeply religious and deeply lonely. When Arlene has a vision of a coming UFO, everyone deals with it in their own way. Brother Bud begins to twist Arlene's belief and visions into a new pseudoreligious cult.

Release

Theatrical
Produced by Melvin Simon Productions, it was initially slated to be released by 20th Century-Fox as part of their long-term distribution agreement. However, the studio shelved it after deeming it unmarketable. Upset with their decision, but fearful of retaliation, Binder persuaded them to allow him to find another distributor, and Universal acquired the film in 1983. Universal test-released the film in two markets under the title Hold Onto Your Dreams to disappointing returns, and initially chose to abandon it as well.
UFOria played at the 1984 Filmex Festival in July 1984, where it was positively received. Based on this reaction, Landmark Theaters booked the film in 1985 for showings in Los Angeles, San Francisco, and Boston, without advertising support from the studio. Exhibitor J.D. Pollack booked the film at the Bleecker Street Cinema in January 1986, and personally funded his own advertising campaign, hiring publicist Lauren Hyman to promote the film. A glowing review from The New York Times spurred Universal to expand the release to more cities, with advertising support. Despite enthusiastic reviews from Roger Ebert and other critics, it did not find a broad audience in its theatrical run.

Home media
Due to its extensive soundtrack of country songs, including hits from Waylon Jennings, the film did not reach VHS until 1987, with some of its music rescored, and it has not yet been released on DVD or Blu-Ray due to the expense of licensing its song score. The film's credits advertised a soundtrack album would be available on Elektra Records, but that album was never released.

The film also aired on cable television in 1986.

Reception
The film received mostly positive reviews. Roger Ebert gave the film a 4 star review, calling the film a "great and goofy comedy", concluding with "Like Repo Man, Turtle Diary and Hannah and Her Sisters, it is willing to go for originality in a world that prizes the entertainment assembly line."

Vincent Canby of The New York Times wrote that the film has a "raffish tone" and is "exuberantly nutty"; he also praised the casting. Kevin Thomas, writing for the Los Angeles Times concluded his review with, "Williams manages to be adorable and never seems all-out crazy; like Ward, you do believe in her, whether or not you believe in UFOs."

The Creature Features movie guide gave the movie 3 out of 5 stars, finding the film eccentric but entertaining, stating the movie was a compelling character study with a surprise ending.

References

External links 
 
 
 
 

1980s science fiction comedy films
1985 films
American science fiction comedy films
1985 comedy films
1980s English-language films
1980s American films